Gábor Máthé (born 10 August 1985 in Békéscsaba) is a Hungarian football (goalkeeper) player who currently plays for Békéscsaba 1912 Előre SE.

External links
HLSZ 
MLSZ 

1985 births
Living people
People from Békéscsaba
Hungarian footballers
Association football goalkeepers
Debreceni VSC players
Létavértes SC players
Dunaújváros FC players
Nyíregyháza Spartacus FC players
Békéscsaba 1912 Előre footballers
Nemzeti Bajnokság I players
Nemzeti Bajnokság II players
Sportspeople from Békés County
21st-century Hungarian people